The 1972 British Hard Court Championships, also known by its sponsored name Rothmans British Hard Court Championships, was a combined men's and women's tennis tournament played on outdoor clay courts at The West Hants Club in Bournemouth, England. The event was part of the Grand Prix circuit and categorized as B class. The tournament was held from 8 to 13 May 1972. Bob Hewitt and Evonne Goolagong won the singles titles.

Finals

Men's singles
 Bob Hewitt defeated  Pierre Barthes 6–2, 6–4, 6–3

Women's singles
 Evonne Goolagong defeated  Helga Niessen Masthoff 6–0, 6–4

Men's doubles
 Bob Hewitt /  Frew McMillan defeated  Ilie Năstase /  Ion Ţiriac 8–6, 6–2, 3–6, 4–6, 6–4

Women's doubles
 Evonne Goolagong /  Helen Gourlay defeated  Brenda Kirk /  Betty Stöve 7–5, 6–1

References

External links
 ITF Tournament details

British Hard Court Championships
British Hard Court Championships
Clay court tennis tournaments
British Hard Court Championships
British Hard Court Championships